Shakhovskoye is a rural locality (a selo) in Pavlovsky District of Ulyanovsk Oblast, Russia.

Notable people
Soviet statesman Mikhail Suslov was born here in 1902.

References

Notes

Sources

Rural localities in Ulyanovsk Oblast
Khvalynsky Uyezd

